Chapmania is a monotypic genus of flatworms belonging to the family Davaineidae. The only species is Chapmania tauricollis.

References

Cestoda